Jeremy Phillip Felton (born July 17, 1987), known professionally as Jeremih, is an American singer, songwriter, and record producer. In 2009, he signed a record deal with Def Jam Recordings. Jeremih's commercial debut single, "Birthday Sex", peaked at number four on the US Billboard Hot 100 chart—leading his self-titled debut album released in June that year, reaching number six on the US Billboard 200 chart. Jeremih's success continued with the release of his second album, All About You, led by the single "Down on Me" (featuring 50 Cent), which also reached the top five of the Billboard Hot 100. In 2014, his single "Don't Tell 'Em" (featuring YG) became his third top-ten hit on the Billboard Hot 100. The song became the lead single for his third studio album, Late Nights released in December 2015. A collaborative album between Jeremih and California singer Ty Dolla Sign, titled MihTy, was released in 2018.

Early life
Born in Chicago, Illinois, Jeremih began playing drums at the age of three and is able to play the saxophone, several percussion instruments, and piano/keyboards. He attended Morgan Park High School, where he was part of the marching band as well as a Latin jazz band. He also learned to play percussion instruments like congas and timbales. Felton was a good student and earned academic honors at Morgan Park High School. His strong academic performance enabled him to graduate from high school a year early. He enrolled at the University of Illinois and Parkland College in Urbana-Champaign. After spending a semester at the university studying engineering, he wanted to change his education to something related to music. He transferred to Columbia College Chicago in 2007 to pursue a degree in music business. After performing a tribute to Ray Charles at one of the campus's talent shows, he received positive feedback and realized his vocal ability, saying that the "music was just taking over".

Career

2009–2011: Jeremih and All About You

While attending Columbia College Chicago, Jeremih collaborated with record producer Mick Schultz. Together, they recorded a song, titled "My Ride". Jeremih received guidance from his cousin, Day26 group member, Willie Taylor. In February 2009, Jeremih met with Def Jam CEO Russell Simmons, and executive vice president of A&R Karen Kwak. After performing for the two, Jeremih signed a recording contract with Def Jam that same day. In 2009, Jeremih released his debut single, "Birthday Sex". The song later peaked at number 4 on the US Billboard Hot 100. In June 2009, Jeremih released his eponymous self-titled debut studio album, Jeremih. The album debuted at number 6 on the US Billboard 200, selling 59,000 copies in its first week. In promotion of the album, Jeremih took part in America's Most Wanted Tour, alongside Lil Wayne, Young Jeezy, and Soulja Boy Tell 'Em. The second single, "Imma Star (Everywhere We Are)", peaked at number 51 on the Billboard Hot 100.

In August 2009, Jeremih was selected by Ron Huberman and Mayor Richard M. Daley of the Chicago Public Schools (CPS) to campaign children to return to school. Community activists protested and demanded CPS to undo their decision, claiming that Jeremih's music was "not appropriate for students" and "promotes teen sex". Huberman argued that "school officials would be naive to pretend students don't listen to Felton's music already". Daley also argued that recording artists have the freedom of speech, noting that Jeremih was "a young man, [with a] back-to-school message, a young man who has had great success recording, producer, going to school, went to public school". In September 2009, Jeremih performed on ABC Daytime'''s soap opera One Life to Live, alongside recording artist Lionel Richie. The two performed "Just Go", a song from Richie's album with the same title.

On June 1, 2010, Jeremih released the first single for his second studio album All About You, titled "I Like" featuring Ludacris. "Down on Me" featuring rapper 50 Cent was confirmed to be the second single from the album. "Down on Me" charted on the number-one position for eight weeks total on Rhythmic Billboard chart. All About You was released on September 28, 2010. The following year, Jeremih and Rick Ross were featured on the song, which was performed by Wale, titled "That Way" from the compilation album Self Made Vol. 1.

2012–2015: Late Nights

In December 2011, Jeremih confirmed he had been working on his third studio album which was originally titled Thumpy Johnson. He announced plans from a summer 2012 release under Def Jam. However, the album was not released. Instead, Jeremih released his first mixtape titled Late Nights with Jeremih on August 7, 2012.

On November 5, 2014, Jeremih and members of his crew were involved in an incident at a Fuddruckers restaurant in Billings, MT in which Jeremih's associates allegedly "hassled" a young female restaurant employee and a manager for discriminating against them. Members of Jeremih's crew responded to the alleged racism by taking over the restaurant's microphone, throwing beer onto employees, and allegedly throwing a glass beer bottle into the kitchen, getting broken glass into the fryer and forcing the restaurant to close temporarily. The Billings Police Department sought but never issued arrest warrants in response to the incident. Surveillance footage of the altercation was published by TMZ, and the concert promoter for Jeremih's Billings performance offered refunds to audience members and renounced the actions taken by Jeremih and his crew. 

"All the Time" is a song which originally appeared on his mixtape Late Nights with Jeremih but was re-released with an additional verse by rapper Lil Wayne as a single. The song was released on April 16, 2013, as a digital download. On July 17, 2014, Jeremih formally released his collaborative EP "No More" with Shlohmo through his Twitter account.

The first single off Jeremih's third studio album (retitled Late Nights: The Album), "Don't Tell 'Em" featuring YG, was released on June 6, 2014. The second single, "Planez" featuring J. Cole was released on January 22, 2015. The first promotional single "Tonight Belongs to U!" featuring Flo Rida was released on April 21, 2015. The third single, "Oui" was released on October 30, 2015. The second promotional single, "Royalty" featuring Big Sean and Future, was released October 29, 2015. The third promotional single "Peace Sign" featuring Fabolous and Red Cafe was released November 18, 2015. The fourth single, "Pass Dat" was released December 1, 2015. On December 4, Jeremih finally released the album to critical acclaim. To promote the album, Jeremih embarked on his Late Nights Uncut Tour.

2016–present: MihTy
On February 7, 2016, Jeremih revealed his fourth studio album will be called, Later That Night in an interview with Billboard. In the same interview, he mentioned he had been recently writing songs for Kanye West and Nicki Minaj. In the summer of 2016, Jeremih headlined his first European concert tour. In July 2016, Jeremih released his second mixtape called Late Nights: Europe, which he recorded while on tour overseas. He stated that he was 90% done with his upcoming album Later That Night that would complete his "Late Night" series.

In June 2016, Jeremih announced a joint album with PartyNextDoor titled Late Night Party, which he said would be released before Later That Night. Following this announcement, the two artists headlined a joint tour called Summer's Over Tour scheduled for November and December 2016. In the last week of the tour, it was announced that Jeremih would removed from the tour. The decision came after Jeremih left the stage mid-performance in Chicago, sent a body-double to perform in Houston, and criticized PartyNextDoor on stage in Dallas. A few months later, Jeremih stated that there were arguments between the two artists' teams, but he had no ill will towards PartyNextDoor.

On Cinco de Mayo 2017, Jeremih released an EP, Cinco De MihYo, which he had written and recorded in 24 hours. In March 2018, Jeremih released an EP titled The Chocolate Box. Pitchfork stated, "When his projects are well-considered, or made with hyper-focused collaborators, he can be the most enchanting man in the room," but called one of the four tracks awkward and bored.

On June 8, 2018, Jeremih and Ty Dolla Sign released "The Light" as the lead single from their collaboration album MihTy. The 11-track album was released on October 26, 2018, and features guest appearances from Chris Brown, French Montana, and Wiz Khalifa.

In July 2018, Jeremih announced a joint tour with singer Teyana Taylor called Later That Night. The tour dates were from August 3 through September 8 in the United States. On August 15, Teyana tweeted that she would be leaving the tour due to mistreatment from Jeremih.

In 2019, Jeremih was featured in Chantel Jeffries' song and music video "Chase the Summer". In March 2020, Jeremih was featured on the remix for "Baby Girl" by Bryce Vine. On May 3, 2021, DJ Khaled released a music video for his song "Thankful" from his album Khaled Khaled featuring Jeremih and Lil Wayne.

Musical style
Jeremih cited Michael Jackson, Stevie Wonder, and R. Kelly as his biggest influences. He described their music as "timeless", calling them "true musician-artists". With the release of his debut album, Andy Kellman of Allmusic compared Jeremih's vocals to Slim of 112 and Raphael Saadiq, noting that his "charmingly sly voice...is hard to not like". In contrast, Ken Capobianco of The Boston Globe felt that Jeremih's voice was "thin", showing "little range". Jody Rosen expressed that Jeremih "has a way with tunes and hooks". He received comparisons to The-Dream, R. Kelly, and Stevie Wonder.

Health
In November 2020, Jeremih was hospitalized in Chicago after testing positive for COVID-19. By November 14, he was reported to be on a ventilator in the intensive care unit. He was taken off the ventilator on November 19 but remained in critical condition. His spokesman said Jeremih has no underlying conditions. Jeremih was transferred out of intensive care on November 21, into a general hospital to make a full recovery. He was released from the hospital on December 4.

Discography

Studio albums
 Jeremih (2009)
 All About You (2010)
 Late Nights (2015) TBA'' (2023)

Awards and nominations
MOBO Awards
The Music of Black Origin Awards (MOBO Awards) is an awards ceremony established in 1995 by Kanya King.

!Source
|-
| style="text-align:center;"|2009
|Jeremih
|Best R&B/Soul Act
|
| style="text-align:center;"|
|-

American Music Awards
The American Music Awards is an annual awards ceremony created by Dick Clark in 1973.

!Source
|-
| style="text-align:center;"|2009
|Jeremih
|T-Mobile Soul/R&B Breakthrough Artist
|
| style="text-align:center;"|
|-

Grammy Awards

!Source
|- 
| style="text-align:center;"|2016
| "Planez" (with J. Cole)
| Best R&B Performance
| 
| style="text-align:center;"|
|-

NAACP Awards
An NAACP Image Award is an accolade presented by the American National Association for the Advancement of Colored People to honor outstanding people of color in film, television, music, and literature.

!Source
|-
| style="text-align:center;"|2010
|Jeremih
|Outstanding New Artist
|
| style="text-align:center;"|
|-

Chicago Music Awards
The Chicago Music Awards is an annual awards ceremony for music artist professionals to get recognized for their talents and hard work.  Ephraim Martin, CMA President, is the founder.

!Source
|-
| style="text-align:center;"|2010
|Jeremih
|Best New Entertainer Of The Year
|
| style="text-align:center;"|
|-
| style="text-align:center;"|2010
|Jeremih
|Songwriter Of The Year
|
| style="text-align:center;"|
|-
| style="text-align:center;"|2010
|Jeremih
|R&B Entertainer Of The Year
|
| style="text-align:center;"|
|-
| style="text-align:center;"|2011
|Jeremih
|Best Male Vocalist Of The Year
|
| style="text-align:center;"|
|-

Billboard Music Awards 
The Billboard Music Award is an honor given by Billboard magazine, the preeminent publication covering the music business. The Billboard Music Awards show had been held annually in December until it went dormant in 2007, but it returned in May 2011. By Billboard Music Award.

!Source
|-
| style="text-align:center;"|2012
|Jeremih Ft.50 Cent-Down On Me
|Top R&B Song
|
| style="text-align:center;"|
|-
| style="text-align:center;"|2015
|Jeremih Ft.YG-Don't Tell Em
|Top R&B Song
|
| style="text-align:center;"|
|-

iHeartRadio Music Awards
The iheartRadio award honors the biggest Artists and Songs of the year.

!Source
|-
| style="text-align:center;"|2015
|Jeremih Ft YG-Don't Tell Em
|Hip Hop/R&B Song of the Year
|
| style="text-align:center;"|
|-

References

External links
 
 
 
 

1987 births
Living people
21st-century American singers
African-American male singers
African-American record producers
American contemporary R&B singers
American hip hop record producers
American hip hop singers
American male pop singers
American male singers
Columbia College Chicago alumni
Def Jam Recordings artists
Midwest hip hop musicians
Parkland College alumni
Record producers from Illinois
Singers from Chicago
Songwriters from Illinois